Novotel is a French midscale hotel brand owned by Accor. Created in 1967 in France, the company grew into what became the Accor group in 1983, and Novotel remained a pillar brand of Accor's multi-brand strategy. Novotel manages 559 hotels in 65 countries (2021).

History

From Novotel to Accor 

The first Novotel was launched in Lille, France, in 1967. It was inspired by American motels with comfortable rooms, a restaurant and parking. By 1970, seven Novotel hotels were in operation, and the group raised the funds to develop internationally.

By 1975, Novotel opened 60 hotels in France and 13 in Europe. Novotel bought Mercure in 1975, and Sofitel in 1980. In 1981, Novotel entered the Asian market with the opening of a hotel in Singapore.

Novotel reached the top 10 of hotel groups worldwide with 319 hotels. It turned into the Accor group in 1983, and was introduced to the Paris stock exchange index the same year. Novotel survived as Accor's strong midscale brand alongside Mercure. In 1984, Novotel bought the New York Times Square building, a city where the company already operated the Roosevelt Hotel on Madison Avenue.

In 1986, Novotel introduced full breakfast buffets. In 1995, Novotel launched an international competition to award the best chefs of its hotels, which became the Victoires internationales de la cuisine in 2001 and stretched its scope to ibis and Mercure chefs.

Since 2000s: Modernization 

By the end of the 1990s, ibis hotels took the leadership on cities' peripheries, leading Novotel to redefine a strategy towards city centers, and to launch a global refurbishment program based on design and modularity, bringing Novotel closer to Accor's upscale brand Sofitel. In 2004, Novotel introduced more ergonomic and elegant rooms (Novation) rooms. In 2008, Novotel introduced new organic bath products branded "N".

In November 2011, Novotel and Microsoft prototyped a futuristic room showcased at the Paris Vaugirard location and dubbed "Room 3120". In 2013, the Xbox became available to customers, and successfully tested a virtual concierge (Monscierge) within its hotels. In 2014, Novotel introduced a multimedia table, PLAY, to provide digital guest services.

In 2012, Novotel sold its New York Times Square location in a €160m sale and management-back deal. In 2013, Novotel opened its 100th hotel in Asia Pacific. In 2016, Novotel opened its largest hotel worldwide, in Madrid, and a new flagship hotel in London's Canary Wharf the following year. In 2017, the "N" rooms were launched, another step towards design customization. In July 2018, Novotel opened in Seoul its 500th hotel worldwide. In May 2019, Accor opened the Novotel Miami Brickell, the brand's second hotel in the USA.

Description 
Novotel caters to business and leisure travelers, with hotels located in the heart of major international cities, business districts and tourist destinations. Novotel manages 559 hotels in 65 countries (2021).

Development

Novotel Suites 

Since 2010, Novotel also includes the apartment hotel brand Novotel Suites, with 34 hotels worldwide (2018).

See also 
 Accor
 Mercure

References

External links

 Official website

 
Hotels established in 1967